Lago Carite is a lake located in the municipality of Guayama on the island of Puerto Rico. The lake was created in 1913 and serves as a reservoir for irrigation and potable water.

The lake receives flow from the La Plata River and can be used for fishing and recreation.

The name of the lake comes from the area where it is located.

See also

 List of dams and reservoirs in Puerto Rico

References

External links
USGS Real-Time Water Data Carite Lake
Lago Carite USGS Patillas Quad, Puerto Rico, Topographic Map
Proyecto Salon Hogar.

Lakes of Puerto Rico
Guayama, Puerto Rico